Moita dos Ferreiros is a civil parish in the municipality of Lourinhã, Portugal. The population in 2011 was 1,734, in an area of 24.83 km².

References

Freguesias of Lourinhã